K. P. Pillai (1929/30 – 31 August 2021) was an Indian Malayali film director who worked mainly in Malayalam films. He made his film debut as an assistant director in Ramu Kariat's film Abhayam in 1970. He directed Nagaram Sagaram, Vrindavan (1975), Ashtamudikkayal (1977), Kathir Mandapam (1978), Pathira Sooryan (1980) and Priyasakhi Radha (1981).

Life 
K. P. Pillai was the son of Prameswaran Pillai and Devaki Amma. After the completion of education in Varkala Sivagiri, University College he served in Indian Airforce for 21 years.

He died on 31 August 2021 in Thiruvananthapuram at the age of 91.

Filmography 
 Nagaram Sagaram  
 Vrindavan (1975)  
 Ashtamudikkayal (1977)  
 Kathir Mandapam (1978)  
 Pathira Sooryan (1980)  
 Priyasakhi Radha

As assistant director
 Abhayam
 Priya (1971)
 Mayiladum Kunnu
 Inquilab Zindabad
 Panitheeratha Veedu
 Adhyathe Kadha

References

20th-century births
Year of birth uncertain
2021 deaths
Malayalam film directors
20th-century Indian film directors
Film directors from Kerala